The Boeing SolarEagle (Vulture II) was a proposed High-Altitude Long Endurance (HALE) unmanned aerial vehicle solar-electric spy plane developed by Boeing Phantom Works.

It had 20 motors of the same type as the Qinetiq Zephyr designed by Newcastle University. Boeing was awarded an $89 million contract by DARPA's Vulture program, with Boeing covering the remainder. It was slated to make its first flight in 2014, but in 2012 the SolarEagle project was cancelled and DARPA's Vulture program was refocused on advancing photovoltaic and energy storage technologies.

References 

Unmanned aerial vehicles of the United States
SolarEagle
Solar-powered aircraft
2010s United States military reconnaissance aircraft
High-altitude and long endurance aircraft
Propeller aircraft
Cancelled military aircraft projects of the United States